Piperidinone, or Piperidone may refer to several related chemical compounds:

 2-Piperidinone
 3-Piperidinone
 4-Piperidinone

Piperidinones